Pouteria chiricana is a species of plant in the family Sapotaceae. It is endemic to Panama.

References

Flora of Panama
chiricana
Vulnerable plants
Taxonomy articles created by Polbot
Taxa named by Charles Baehni
Taxa named by Paul Carpenter Standley